The Episcopal Church of the Advent-Guild Hall on 6th St. E. in Devil's Lake, North Dakota was built in 1886.  It has also been known as Stone Church.  It was listed on the National Register of Historic Places in 2002.

It was designed in the Second Late Gothic Revival style by North Dakota architect George Hancock.  It was the first church built in Devils Lake, arriving about when the railroad did.

References

Churches on the National Register of Historic Places in North Dakota
Gothic Revival church buildings in North Dakota
Churches completed in 1886
Episcopal church buildings in North Dakota
19th-century Episcopal church buildings
National Register of Historic Places in Ramsey County, North Dakota
1886 establishments in Dakota Territory